Léon-Denis Gérin (June 6, 1894 – April 1, 1975) was a politician Quebec, Canada and a three-term Member of the Legislative Assembly of Quebec (MLA).

Early life

He was born on June 6, 1894 in Sainte-Edwidge-de-Clifton, Eastern Townships.

City politics

Gérin served as a city councillor from 1934 to 1935 and from 1942 to 1943 and as Mayor from 1944 to 1945 in Coaticook, Quebec.

Member of the legislature

He ran as a Union Nationale candidate in the provincial district of Stanstead in the 1948 provincial election and won. He was re-elected in the 1952 and 1956 elections.

Gérin was defeated in the 1960 election against Liberal candidate Georges Vaillancourt.

Death

He died on April 1, 1975.

References

1894 births
1975 deaths
Mayors of places in Quebec
Union Nationale (Quebec) MNAs